Mario R. Mattera is an American politician. A Republican, he is currently serving in the New York State Senate, representing the 2nd district, which includes a sizeable portion of the north shore of central Long Island, including all of the town of Smithtown and portions of the towns of Brookhaven and Huntington.

Prior to running for office, Mattera served as the business agent of the United Association Plumbers Local 200, and was a member of the organization for four decades.

He was first elected to the state senate in 2020, defeating former state trooper Michael Siderakis with 57.7% of the vote. He was sworn into office on January 5, 2021.

State Senate 
Mattera is a ranking member of the Consumer Protection and the Corporations, Authorities, and Commissions committees, and is a member of the Labor and Transportation committees.

Personal life 
Mattera, and his wife, Terry, live in St. James, New York, and have two daughters, named Jessica and Jayme.

Electoral history

References

1963 births
21st-century American politicians
Living people
Republican Party New York (state) state senators